Thomas' is a brand of English muffins and bagels in North America, established in 1880. It is owned by Bimbo Bakeries USA, one of the largest baking companies in the United States, which also owns Entenmann's, Boboli, Sara Lee, Stroehmann, and Arnold bread companies.  Advertisements for the muffins place emphasis on their "nooks and crannies". The company also produces toasting or swirl breads, pitas, wraps, and bagels.

History
The company was founded by Samuel Bath Thomas (1855–1919). In 1874, he immigrated from England to New York City and after other menial jobs began working in a bakery. By 1880, he had purchased his own bakery at 163 Ninth Avenue in Manhattan, where he featured his namesake muffins that were baked on a griddle, not an oven. The business expanded to 337 West 20th Street (a plaque designates the building as "The Muffin House"). Thomas died in 1919, and the company, S. B. Thomas, was inherited by his daughter and nephews, and was incorporated. Later, it was owned by George Weston Bakeries.

Some television commercials for the muffins have highlighted the immigrant story of Thomas, joking about how disappointed his fans in England supposedly were when he decided to take his muffins to America. (Whether the muffins were invented after Thomas had moved to the U.S. is unclear, but the comments in the commercials are not intended to be accurate and are used for a humorous purpose.)

In 2010, the company won a trade secret suit when an executive uploaded the company's recipes and retired to work for Hostess. Annual sales in 2010 for Thomas' English Muffins was estimated to be US$500 million.

See also
 List of brand name breads

Notes

External links 

 

Bagel companies
Brand name breads
Grupo Bimbo brands
Companies established in 1880